Hadley Field was an airport in South Plainfield, in Middlesex County, New Jersey, United States. It contained the Nike Missile Battery NY-65 and was used as a landing site for some of the nation's early air mail service.

See also
Aviation in the New York metropolitan area
List of airports in New Jersey

References

Further reading

External links 

  Night Airmail's first
 Abandoned & Little-Known Airfields – Hadley Field
 Speech of Vice President Nixon on Hadley Field 

Defunct airports in New Jersey
Transportation buildings and structures in Middlesex County, New Jersey
Landmarks in New Jersey
South Plainfield, New Jersey